Epiamomum epiphyticum is a monocotyledonous plant species in the family Zingiberaceae. It was previously placed as Amomum epiphyticum, described by Rosemary Margaret Smith.

References 

Flora of Borneo